The Fujifilm X-T10 is a DSLR-styled mirrorless camera announced by Fujifilm on May 18, 2015. It is a smaller, lighter and more affordable alternative to the Fujifilm X-T1 with which it shares a sensor and processor. The X-T10 lacks the X-T1's weather sealing, has a smaller viewfinder and lower resolution LCD but adds built-in flash and a threaded cable shutter release socket.

In January 2017, Fujifilm announced the X-T20 as the successor to the X-T10.

Some photos taken with a Fuji X-T10

Features

 16.3 MP APS-C X-Trans CMOS II Sensor
 EXR Processor II
 0.39" 2,360k-Dot 0.62x OLED Viewfinder
 3.0" 920k-Dot Tilting LCD Monitor
 Full HD 1080p Video Recording at 60 fps
 Built-in Wi-Fi Connectivity
 Intelligent Hybrid AF with 77 Areas
 Up to 8 fps Shooting and ISO 51200
 Film Simulation Mode
 EF-X8 external shoe-mount flash included

References

X-T10
Cameras introduced in 2015